Stampeders may refer to:

Calgary Stampeders, a Canadian football team
The Stampeders, a Canadian rock trio

See also 
 Stampede (disambiguation)